Nausigaster is a genus of syrphid flies, or hoverflies, in the family Syrphidae. Larvae have been recorded from decaying cacti and bromeliads.

Species
These 15 species belong to the genus Nausigaster:

 Nausigaster bonariensis Lynch Arribalzaga, 1892 c g
 Nausigaster chrysidiformis Shannon, 1922 c g
 Nausigaster clara Curran, 1941 i c g
 Nausigaster curvinervis Curran, 1941 i c g
 Nausigaster flukei Curran, 1941 c g
 Nausigaster geminata Townsend, 1897 i c g
 Nausigaster meridionalis Townsend, 1897 c g
 Nausigaster nova Curran, 1941 i c g
 Nausigaster peruviensis Shannon, 1922 c g
 Nausigaster punctulata Williston, 1883 i c g b
 Nausigaster scutellaris Adams, 1904 i c g
 Nausigaster texana Curran, 1941 i c g b
 Nausigaster tuberculata Carrera, Lopes & Lane, 1947 c g
 Nausigaster unimaculata Townsend, 1897 i c g b
 Nausigaster vanzolinii Andretta & Carrera, 1952 c g

Data sources: i = ITIS, c = Catalogue of Life, g = GBIF, b = Bugguide.net

References

Further reading

External links

 

Diptera of South America
Hoverfly genera
Eumerini
Taxa named by Samuel Wendell Williston